The Port Dover Sailors are a junior hockey team based in Port Dover, Ontario, Canada. They play in the Niagara & District Junior C Hockey League of the Ontario Hockey Association until the 2016-17 season when the league joined the Provincial Junior Hockey League and placed under the Bloomfield Division of the new league.

History
The Port Dover Clippers were founded in 1988 as members of the Niagara & District Junior C Hockey League.  The Clippers were 1990 and 1991 Niagara East champions and Niagara co-champions.  In 1990, the Clippers would fall to the Orangeville Crushers of the Mid-Ontario Junior C Hockey League 4-games-to-1 in the Clarence Schmalz Cup OHA provincial quarter-final.  Their western co-champions, the New Hamburg Spirit 83's would fare no better, dropping one of the other quarter-finals in four-straight games to the Great Lakes Junior C Hockey League champion Belle River Canadiens. The next year was more of the same, as Port Dover and New Hamburg were the co-champions, New Hamburg lost the provincial quarter-final to Belle River again (this time in six games), and Port Dover fell to Orangeville again in five.

In 1999, the Clippers took leave of the Niagara District league. Clippers changed their name to the Port Dover Sailors and applied for membership in the Ontario Hockey Association Junior Development League.

In 2006, the OHAJDL changed its name to the Southern Ontario Junior Hockey League; the Sailors competed in this league until 2012.

From 2011 until 2013 the team was known as the Norfolk Rebels and split time between Port Dover and Waterford, Ontario.

In 2013, the team was renamed the Port Dover Sailors.

The playoffs for the 2019-20 season were cancelled due to the COVID-19 pandemic, leading to the team not being able to play a single game.

Season-by-season record

References

External links
 Sailors Webpage

Southern Ontario Junior Hockey League teams
Ice hockey clubs established in 1988
Norfolk County, Ontario
1988 establishments in Ontario